

Mathematics

In mathematics, a duality, generally speaking, translates concepts, theorems or mathematical structures into other concepts, theorems or structures, in a one-to-one fashion, often (but not always) by means of an involution operation: if the dual of A is B, then the dual of B is A.

 Alexander duality
 Alvis–Curtis duality
 Artin–Verdier duality
 Beta-dual space
 Coherent duality
 De Groot dual
 Dual abelian variety
 Dual basis in a field extension
 Dual bundle
 Dual curve
 Dual (category theory)
 Dual graph
 Dual group
 Dual object
 Dual pair
 Dual polygon
 Dual polyhedron
 Dual problem
 Dual representation
 Dual q-Hahn polynomials
 Dual q-Krawtchouk polynomials
 Dual space
 Dual topology
 Dual wavelet
 Duality (optimization)
 Duality (order theory)
 Duality of stereotype spaces
 Duality (projective geometry)
 Duality theory for distributive lattices
 Dualizing complex
 Dualizing sheaf
 Eckmann–Hilton duality
 Esakia duality
 Fenchel's duality theorem
 Hodge dual
 Jónsson–Tarski duality
 Lagrange duality
 Langlands dual 
 Lefschetz duality
 Local Tate duality
 Opposite category
 Poincaré duality
 Twisted Poincaré duality
 Poitou–Tate duality
 Pontryagin duality
 S-duality (homotopy theory)
 Schur–Weyl duality
 Series-parallel duality
 Serre duality
 Spanier–Whitehead duality
 Stone's duality
 Tannaka–Krein duality
 Verdier duality
 Grothendieck local duality

Philosophy and religion

 Dualism (philosophy of mind)
 Epistemological dualism
 Dualistic cosmology
 Soul dualism
 Yin and yang

Engineering
 Duality (electrical circuits)
 Duality (mechanical engineering)
 Observability/Controllability in control theory

Physics
 Complementarity (physics)
 Dual resonance model
 Duality (electricity and magnetism)
 Englert–Greenberger duality relation
 Holographic duality
 Kramers–Wannier duality
 Mirror symmetry
 3D mirror symmetry
 Montonen–Olive duality
 Mysterious duality (M-theory)
 Seiberg duality
 String duality
 S-duality
 T-duality
 U-duality
 Wave-particle duality

Economics and finance
 Convex duality

References

Mathematics-related lists
Physics-related lists